A number of French motor vessels have been named Saint Germain, including:

, a cargo ship torpedoed and sunk in 1940
, a train ferry in service 1951–88

Ship names